The Ki language, Tuki (Baki, Oki), is a Southern Bantoid language of Cameroon.

The dialects are Kombe (Tukombe), Cenga (Tocenga), Tsinga (Tutsingo), Bundum, Njo (Tonjo), Ngoro (Tu Ngoro), Mbere (Tumvele) and possibly Leti/Mengisa and Mbwasa.

References

Mbam languages
Languages of Cameroon